Aidi Gerde Tuisk (born 1 March 2002 in Tallinn) is an Estonian professional racing cyclist, who currently rides for UCI Women's Team .

Major results

2018
 2nd Debutant race, National Cyclo-cross Championships

2019
 National Junior Road Championships
2nd Road race
2nd Time trial
 2nd Junior race, National Cyclo-cross Championships

2020
 1st  Road race, National Road Championships
 1st  Time trial, National Junior Road Championships

2021
 1st  Road race, National Road Championships
 3rd Time trial, National Road Championships

2022
 1st  Road race, National Road Championships
 2nd Time trial, National Under-23 Road Championships

References

External links

2002 births
Living people
Estonian female cyclists
Sportspeople from Tallinn